Ngô Đức Thắng (born 4 May 1988) is a Vietnamese footballer who plays as either a midfielder or defenderfor Quảng Nam in the V.League 1.

References 

1985 births
Living people
Vietnamese footballers
V.League 1 players
Hanoi FC players
Dong Nai FC players
Than Quang Ninh FC players
Association football midfielders
Association football defenders